Aequorivita sinensis  is a Gram-negative, facultatively anaerobic, rod-shaped and non-motile bacterium from the genus of Aequorivita which has been isolated from marine sediments.

References

Flavobacteria
Bacteria described in 2020